Bunker Hill High School is a public high school located in Bunker Hill, Illinois.

Student Body
43% of the student body qualifies for free or reduced lunch. The high school has an enrollment of 213 students. There are 13 students for every 1 teacher. 17% of students scored proficient in math and 32% scored proficient or above in reading.

Sports
BHHS offers a variety of sports to its students. The following is a list of all sports teams at BHHS:

Boys Athletics
Baseball
Basketball
Football
Soccer
Wrestling
Volleyball
Girls Athletics
Basketball
Cheer
Soccer
Softball
Tennis
Volleyball

Demographics
The demographics of Bunker Hill High School in 2020:

References

Public high schools in Illinois
Schools in Macoupin County, Illinois
Public middle schools in Illinois
Buildings and structures in Macoupin County, Illinois